Christ Bearing the Cross is a tempera painting attributed to Nikolaos Tzafouris. Nikolaos Tzafouris was a Greek painter.  He is one of the founding members of the Cretan School along with Andreas Ritzos, Andreas Pavias, and Angelos Akotantos.  He was influenced by Angelos Akotantos.  According to the Institute of Neohellenic Research, thirteen paintings are attributed to Tzafouris. Tzafouris was active between 1480 and 1501.  Tzafouris had a workshop in Heraklion. Tzafouris painted religious themes for local churches.  The painting is a mixture of Italian and Greek Byzantine prototypes.  The work followed the traditional maniera greca and was influenced by Venetian painting.  His most notable works are the Madre della Consolazione and Christ Bearing the Cross.  Christ Bearing the Cross is in Manhattan on display at Metropolitan Museum of Art.

Description 
The work is an egg tempera painting with gold leaf on wood with dimensions of 69.2 cm (27.25 in) x 54.6 cm (21.5 in).  The icon was finished towards the end of the 15th century.  Christ is carrying a cross.  The scene is the traditional Golgotha portion of the Crucifixion sequence.  The soldiers on the right are dressed in armor modeled after Venetian attire, while the soldiers on the left of the painting wear Byzantine or Cretan styled armor.

The soldier's attire is painted in exquisite detail.  The Italian Renaissance painting style closely resembles the sfumato technique.  The artist is trying to escape the typical flattened surface prevalent within the Byzantine-influenced maniera greca.  Tzafouris attempts to create the illusion of a foreground and a background.  The gilded background further accentuates the figures and landscape.  The geometric shape of the mountain is reminiscent of Michael Damaskinos's Adoration of the Kings.  The painting features Latin and Greek inscriptions.  There are five icons signed by the author that survived. Christ Bearing the Cross is one of them.

A painting created in a similar style by Cimabue called Christ Mocked just recently sold for €24m (£20m; $26.6m) at auction, setting a new record. The sale price was four times the estimate.  The action house Acteon said it was a new record for a Greek-Italian Byzantine painting.  It was purchased by an anonymous buyer from northern France.

Gallery

References

Bibliography

Paintings in the collection of the Metropolitan Museum of Art
Paintings depicting Christ carrying the cross
Cretan Renaissance paintings